Derek Stephen Prince is an American voice actor who has played various roles in the Digimon series, the voice of Elgar in the live-action Power Rangers Turbo, and Power Rangers in Space.

In the world of anime, he played Keitaro Urashima in Love Hina, DemiDevimon and Piedmon in Digimon, Ken Ichijouji and Veemon in Digimon 02 and Impmon in Digimon Tamers, Uryū Ishida in Bleach, Iggy in JoJo's Bizarre Adventure: Stardust Crusaders and Shino Aburame in Naruto. In video games, he provides the voice of Vexen in the Kingdom Hearts series Derek has been part of the Voice123 roaster since September, 2008. He reprised his role as Ken Ichijouji for YouTuber Aficionados Chris' review of Digimon. Some of the characters he voices are intellectual or brainy, such as Vexen, and Uryū.

Filmography

Anime

 .hack//Legend of the Twilight – Reki
 Accel World – Sulfur Pot (Ep. 19)
 Aldnoah.Zero – Marylcian
 Apocalypse Zero – Bolt
 Argento Soma – Lab Assistant B
 Arc the Lad – Gene
 Battle B-Daman – Li Yong Fa, Monkey Don
 Beyblade Burst – Ranjiro Kiyama (Seasons 3 & 5)
 Blade of the Immortal – Taito Magatsu
 Bleach – Uryū Ishida
 Blood Lad – Sabao
 Blue Exorcist – Reiji Shiratori / Astaroth (Eps. 1-2)
 Bobobo-bo Bo-bobo – Nunchuck Nick, Wiggin' Tribe Spokesman
 Code Geass R2 – Additional Voices
 Cowboy Bebop – Lin, Shin
 Cyborg 009 – Dr. Gaia, Machine Gun, Kain, alternate voice of Joe Shimamura (select episodes)
 D.Gray-man – Selim (Ep. 43)
 Demon Slayer: Kimetsu no Yaiba – Spider Demon (Elder Brother), Kakushi
 Digimon Adventure – DemiDevimon, Piedmon, Digitamamon
 Digimon Adventure 02 – Ken Ichijouji, DemiVeemon/Veemon/ExVeemon/Paildramon (shared)/Imperialdramon (shared)
 Digimon Frontier – Grumblemon/Gigasmon, Dynasmon, Oryxmon, Honeybeemon
 Digimon Fusion – Jeremy Tsurugi, Zamielmon
 Digimon Tamers – Impmon/Beelzemon
 Doraemon – Stan
 Dragon Ball Super – Freeza (Toonami Asia dub)
 Duel Masters 2.0 – Dr. Root and Multi-Card Monty
 Durarara!! – Gangster (Ep. 12.5), Additional Voices
 Eyeshield 21 – Yoichi Hiruma
 Flint the Time Detective – Batterball, Elekin, Young Orville Wright (Ep. 17), Young Jean-Henri Fabre (ep. 30)
 Fushigi Yūgi – Keisuke Yūki
 Ghost in the Shell: Stand Alone Complex 2nd Gig – Runaway worker in the episode "Excavation"
 Ghost in the Shell: SAC_2045 – Underwear Man
 Ground Defense Force! Mao-chan – Ichiro Suteki
 Gurren Lagann – Jamo-ichi 
 Gun Frontier – Tochiro Oyama
 Hunter × Hunter – Lippo, Shacmono Tocino, Examinee A (Ep. 6)
 JoJo's Bizarre Adventure: Stardust Crusaders – Iggy
 Kikaider – Ichiro/Kikaider 0-1
 Kill la Kill – Guts
 Kite Liberator – Tsuin
 Love Hina – Keitaro Urashima (as David Umansky)
 Lucky ☆ Star – Cherry, Additional Voices
 Lupin III – Mr. X, French Police Officer
 Mahoromatic – Suguru Misato (credited as David Umansky)
 MÄR: Märchen Awakens Romance – Phantom/Tom
 Mars Daybreak – Crowley
 Mobile Suit Gundam F91 – Birgit Pirjo
 Mon Colle Knights – Mondo Ooya
 Monster – Rudy Gillen
 Naruto – Shino Aburame (episode 34-220)
 Naruto: Shippuden – Shino Aburame (episode 33-present)
 Nightwalker – Koichi Akiba
 Overman King Gainer – Bello Korossha
 Paradise Kiss – Arashi
 Patlabor WXIII – Shizuo Miyanomori, Police Officer
 Planetes – Chung
 Persona 4: The Animation – Naoki Konishi
 Redline – Little Deyzuna
 Rurouni Kenshin – Beshimi, Sawagejo Cho, misc. voices
 Samurai Champloo – Tomonoshin Shibui, Denkibou
 S-CRY-ed – George Tatsunami, Masaki
 Shinzo – King Nipper, Professor Parasite
 Sins of the Flesh (OVA) – Adolpho
 Stitch! – Kenny
 Sword Art Online – Kibao (Ep. 2)
 Tenjho Tenge – Tsutomu Ryuuzaki
 Trigun – Zazie the Beast (credited as David Umansky)
 Vampire Knight series – Class Representative, Hunter Association President, Additional Voices
 Vampire Princess Miyu – Yasuhiro Takashima, Cat
 Yu-Gi-Oh! Duel Monsters – Rare Hunter #2
 Yukikaze – Captain Tom "Tomahawk" John

Animation
 Chaotic – Codemaster Tirasis
 Lilo & Stitch: The Series – Luki
 NFL Rush Zone – Jackson, Seahawks Rusher
 Shorty McShorts' Shorts – Phil & Boomer (of The Phabulizers)
 Zentrix – Zeus

Live-action television
 Big Bad Beetleborgs – Noxic, Super Noxic (voice) (credited as David Umansky)
 ER – Fireman
 Profiler – Damion Kanaras
 Power Rangers Zeo – Auric the Conqueror, Staroid, Digster (voice) (all uncredited)
 Power Rangers Turbo – Elgar (voice) (credited main role, as David Umansky), Flamite (voice), Wild Weeder (voice) (uncredited)
 Power Rangers In Space – Elgar (voice) (credited 1st half of season, as David Umansky, uncredited 2nd half), Tankenstein (voice) (uncredited)
 Power Rangers Lost Galaxy – Treacheron, Fishface (voice) (second voice)
 Power Rangers Time Force – Jatara (voice)
 Power Rangers Wild Force – Tire Org (voice)
 Saved by the Bell: The New Class – Tuba Player

Film

 Bio Zombie – Crazy Bee (voice) (credited as David Umansky)
 Bleach: Memories of Nobody – Uryū Ishida
 Bleach: The DiamondDust Rebellion – Uryū Ishida
 Bleach: Hell Verse – Uryū Ishida
 Blue Exorcist: The Movie – Reiji Shiratori
 Digimon: The Movie – Veemon, DemiVeemon, Pizza Guy
 Digimon: Revenge of Diaboromon – Ken Ichijouji, Veemon, DemiVeemon, ExVeemon, Imperialdramon (shared)
 Digimon: Battle of Adventurers – Takehito Uehara: Minami's Dad
 Digimon: Runaway Locomon – Beelzemon
 Digimon Adventure: Last Evolution Kizuna – DemiVeemon/Veemon/ExVeemon, Ken Ichijouji
 Jungle Shuffle – Louca (credited as Steve Prince)
 Lu over the Wall – Chief Priest of Shrine
 Naruto Shippuden 3: Inheritors of the Will of Fire – Shino Aburame
 Scary Movie 3 - Aliens (Shared with Tom Kenny Uncredited) 
 Time of Eve – Koji
 Turbo: A Power Rangers Movie – Elgar (voice)
 Versus – Beard (voice) (credited as David Umansky)
 Waking Life – Man Talking to Bartender (voice) (credited as Steven Prince)

 Ni no Kuni – Master Zeelok

Video games

 .hack//INFECTION – Nuke Usagimaru (as Steven Prince)
 .hack//MUTATION – Nuke Usagimaru (as Steven Prince)
 .hack//OUTBREAK – Nuke Usagimaru (as Steven Prince)
 .hack//QUARANTINE – Nuke Usagimaru (as Steven Prince)
 Bleach: Shattered Blade – Uryū Ishida
 Bleach: The Blade of Fate – Uryū Ishida
 Bleach: Dark Souls – Uryū Ishida
 Bleach: The 3rd Phantom – Uryū Ishida
 Bleach: Soul Resurrección – Uryū Ishida
 Catherine: Full Body – Abul Bahril
 Danganronpa 2: Goodbye Despair – Fuyuhiko Kuzuryu
 Danganronpa V3: Killing Harmony – Kokichi Oma
 Demon Slayer: Kimetsu no Yaiba – The Hinokami Chronicles – Kakushi, Spider Demon (Elder Brother)
 Digimon All-Star Rumble – Veemon/ExVeemon, Imperialdramon Paladin Mode Impmon/Beelzemon
 Digimon Rumble Arena – Ken Ichijouji, Veemon/Imperialdramon (shared), Imperialdramon Paladin Mode (shared), Impmon/Beelzemon
 Eureka Seven vol.1: New Wave – Hooky Zueff (uncredited)
 Guilty Gear -STRIVE- – Lucifero, Asuka R. Kreutz
 Kingdom Hearts Re:Chain of Memories – Vexen
 Kingdom Hearts 358/2 Days – Vexen (archive sound)
 Kingdom Hearts Birth by Sleep – Even
 Kingdom Hearts HD 1.5 Remix – Vexen (archive footage)
 Kingdom Hearts HD 2.5 Remix – Vexen/Even (archived and new footage)
 Kingdom Hearts III – Vexen/Even
 Kingdom Hearts: Melody of Memory – Even
 Naruto series – Shino Aburame, Shima
 Persona 3 – Takaya Sakaki, Takeharu Kirijo
 Persona 4 – Naoki Konishi (uncredited)
 Shin Megami Tensei IV – Abbot Hugo, Kiyoharu
 The Legend of Heroes: Trails of Cold Steel – Patrick Hyarms
 The Legend of Heroes: Trails of Cold Steel IV – President Samuel Rocksmith, Patrick Hyarms

References

External links

Derek Stephen Prince at Voice123.com
Interview with Derek Stephen Prince by AnimeOmnitude

Living people
American radio personalities
American male voice actors
American male video game actors
20th-century American male actors
21st-century American male actors
Year of birth missing (living people)